HMS Elizabeth was a 74-gun third-rate ship of the line of the Royal Navy, launched on 23 May 1807 at Blackwall.

Career
On 12 March 1812, as the merchant ship  was returning from Lima and Cadiz, the French privateer Amelia captured her. However,  recaptured Ramoncita.

On 25 May 1814, Elizabeth captured the French naval xebec Aigle and her prize, the Glorioso off Corfu.  shared in the prize money though it was the boats of Elizabeth that performed the actual capture in an action that in 1847 earned for their crews the Naval General Service Medal with clasp, "24 May Boat Service 1814". Aigle was armed with 6 guns, a howitzer, and 3 swivel guns, and had a crew of 40 men. The capture of the Aigle represented the last naval surrender of the French Tricolour in the Napoleonic Wars.

Fate
Elizabeth was broken up in 1820.

Notes

Citations

References

Lavery, Brian (2003) The Ship of the Line - Volume 1: The development of the battlefleet 1650-1850. Conway Maritime Press. .

Ships of the line of the Royal Navy
Repulse-class ships of the line
1807 ships